Noor Orpa de Baat (born 4 October 2000) is a field hockey player from the Netherlands, who plays as a midfielder.

Personal life
Noor de Baat was born and raised in Broek in Waterland, Netherlands.

Career

Club hockey
In the Dutch Hoofdklasse, de Baat plays club hockey for Amsterdam.

National teams

Under–18
In 2018 at the EuroHockey Youth Championship, de Baat was a member of the Netherlands U–18 team. During the tournament in Santander, de Baat scored once in the Dutch side's gold medal campaign.

Under–21
De Baat made her debut for the Netherlands U–21 side in 2019 at the EuroHockey Junior Championship in Valencia. At the tournament, de Baat scored two goals, and helped the team to a silver medal finish, losing in the final to Spain.

References

External links
 
 

2000 births
Living people
Female field hockey midfielders
People from Waterland
Amsterdamsche Hockey & Bandy Club players
Dutch female field hockey players
Sportspeople from North Holland
21st-century Dutch women

2018 FIH Indoor Hockey World Cup players
2023 FIH Indoor Hockey World Cup players